Thalassery Pier locally known as Kadalpalam is located in Thalassery, Kannur District of Kerala state, south India.

It is an old pier extending out into the Arabian Sea. It is frequented by people taking evening walks.
This "Kadalpalam" was used as a commercial access through the sea, to and from the Tellicherry Bazar, during the European rule. It is an old story now. At present it is in a deteriorating state. Now it can be preserved as a Tourist Centre.

It was in 1910 that the East India Company constructed the pier which extends to the Arabian Sea for transporting commodities to and from ships. The large rocks on the shore and shallow waters often led to shipwrecks and hence the pier was constructed, with huge cranes placed at its end and rail tracks on either side for easy transport of goods from the godowns situated at the shore.

A busy commercial centre then, Thalassery witnessed brisk development with its export of spices, coffee, fish, wood, and pepper, attracting people from all over.

The town became an administrative centre of operations and the judicial headquarters while the port stood a mute observer to the glory of the town and its development. It was the advent of the Mangalore port which reduced its significance principally, while many more aspects contributed to its slow degeneration. The ships disappeared, and gradually the cranes and the trolley tracks.

The condition of the pier is deteriorating and hence the entry is officially blocked with a wall in view of safety.

Many Malayalam movies are shot here including the famous shot in Thattathin Marayathu.

See also
Thalassery
Thalassery Fort
Overbury's folly
Thalassery Stadium

References

Piers in India
Buildings and structures in Thalassery
1910 establishments in India
Buildings and structures completed in 1910
20th-century architecture in India